James Horn (1855–1932) was a New Zealand politician.

James Horn or Jim Horn may refer to:

 Jim Horn (born 1940), American musician
 James Horn, English American author and historian, president of the Jamestown Rediscovery Foundation
 James T. Horn (born 1966), American country music singer

See also
 James Horne (disambiguation)